Pier Pressure is the debut mixtape by British rapper ArrDee. It was released on 18 March 2022 through Island. It features guest appearances from Aitch, Lola Young, Russ Millions, Tion Wayne, Bugzy Malone, Fivio Foreign, E1 (3x3), ZT (3x3), Buni, Darkoo and Digga D. The reissue adds appearances from Black Sherif and Kyla.

Background
ArrDee, born Riley Davies, saw success being featured on the remix of Russ Millions and Tion Wayne's song "Body", which topped the charts in various countries including the UK. He then released the single "Oliver Twist", referencing the book by Charles Dickens, which peaked at number six on the UK Singles Chart

Singles
The first official single from Pier Pressure was "Flowers (Say My Name)", which samples the track of the same name by Sweet Female Attitude and "Say My Name" by Destiny's Child. It was released on 11 November 2021 and peaked at number 5 on the UK Singles Chart, spending thirteen weeks in the top 40, seventeen weeks in the top 100, with seven of those weeks being in the chart's top 10.

On 3 February 2022, Davies released the second single, "War", featuring rapper Aitch. "War" debuted at number 6 on the UK Singles Chart on 11 February 2022.

On 4 March 2022, Davies released "Come & Go" as the third single from the mixtape.

Critical reception

Pier Pressure was released to generally positive reviews. Clash magazine felt the rapper "cement[ed] his position within UK rap's upper echelons". Sophie Williams, writing for NME felt Pier Pressure was "fresh" and "fierce".

Promotion
In November 2021, Davies announced his first UK tour.

Track listing

Charts

Weekly charts

Year-end charts

Certifications

Release history

References

2022 mixtape albums
Debut mixtape albums
ArrDee albums
Island Records albums